Çarşı is a Turkish word meaning bazaar (or rather, an open market area), and may refer to:

 Çarşı (supporter group)
 Çarşı, Beşiktaş, the old center of the municipality of Beşiktaş
 Çarşı (Istanbul Metro)
 Çarşı Hamam, Mytilene
 Çarşı (Tram İzmir)

Turkish words and phrases